INS Arighat is an upgraded variant of the . It is the second nuclear-powered ballistic missile submarine being built by India under the Advanced Technology Vessel (ATV) project to build nuclear submarines at the Ship Building Centre in Visakhapatnam. It has the code name S3.

The submarine was quietly launched in 2017 and little has been publicly announced about its capabilities and current status. The submarine was originally known as INS Aridhaman but was renamed INS Arighat upon its launch. According to reports released in early 2021, she was to be commissioned in late 2021 alongside INS Vikrant.

Description 
The boat will have one seven-blade propeller powered by a pressurised water reactor. It can achieve a maximum speed of  when on surface and  when submerged.  

The submarine has four launch tubes in its hump, just like her predecessor. She can carry up to 12 K-15 Sagarika missiles (each with a range of ), or four of the under-development K-4 missiles (with a range of ).

Status 
She was outfitted in December 2010, it was announced by the navy officers that she would be launched in mid or late 2011. In the event, years of delay ensued and, in October 2017, it was reported that she would be launched in November or December and would undergo outfitting. The launch took place on 18 October 2017. Arighat was expected to be commissioned in 2021. , INS Arighat was undergoing harbour trials and was slated to be commissioned in 2022. INS Arighat has not been commissioned as of 5 February 2023, and an official commissioning date has not been announced, but it is expected to be commissioned in the coming time.

See also 
 
 
 Future of the Indian Navy
 K Missile family

Arihant-class submarines
Ballistic missile submarines
Nuclear-powered submarines
Ships built in India
Submarines of India
2017 ships
Submarine classes